Semagystia is a genus of moths in the family Cossidae.

Species
 Semagystia agilis (Christoph, 1884)
 Semagystia alaica Yakovlev, 2007
 Semagystia bucharana (Bang-Haas, 1910)
 Semagystia clathrata (Christoph, 1884)
 Semagystia cossoides (Graeser, 1892)
 Semagystia cuhensis de Freina, 1994
 Semagystia dubatolovi Yakovlev, 2007
 Semagystia enigma Yakovlev, 2007
 Semagystia kamelini Yakovlev, 2004
 Semagystia lacertula (Staudinger, 1887)
 Semagystia lukhtanovi Yakovlev, 2007
 Semagystia monticola (Grum-Grshimailo, 1890)
 Semagystia pljustchi Yakovlev, 2007
 Semagystia pushtunica Yakovlev, 2007
 Semagystia stchetkini Yakovlev, 2007
 Semagystia tristis (Bang-Haas, 1912)
 Semagystia tsimgana (Zukowsky, 1936)
 Semagystia wernerithomasi Yakovlev, 2007
 Semagystia witti Yakovlev, 2007

Etymology
The genus name is an anagram of the genus name Stygia, plus Greek sema (meaning blaze).

References

 , 1994: 9. Beitrag zur systematischen Erfassung der Bombiges- und Sphinges-Fauna Kleinasiens. Weiter Kenntnisse über Artenspektrum, Systematik und Verbreitung von Cossidae, Psychidae, Cochildidae, Syntomidae, Saturniidae, Brahmaeidae, Drepanidae, Axiidae, Hepialidae, Dilobidae und Nolidae. (Inserat: Lepidoptera). Atalanta 25 (1/2): 317-348.
 , 2007: New species of Palearctic carpenter-moths (Lepidoptera: Cossidae). Eversmannia 10(2007): 3-23. Full article:

External links
Natural History Museum Lepidoptera generic names catalog

Cossinae